The Ordovician Reedsville Formation is a mapped surficial bedrock unit in  Pennsylvania, Maryland, Virginia, West Virginia, and Tennessee, that extends into the subsurface of Ohio. This rock is a slope-former adjacent to (and stratigraphically below) the prominent ridge-forming Bald Eagle sandstone unit in the Appalachian Mountains.  It is often abbreviated Or on geologic maps.

Description
The Reedsville Formation is an olive-gray to dark-gray siltstone, shale, and fine-grained sandstone. In Central Pennsylvania along the Nittany Arch, and extending into the subsurface of northern West Virginia, the base of the Reedsville formation includes the black calcareous Antes Shale formation.

Type section
The type locality is at Reedsville, Pennsylvania.

Age
Relative age dating of the Reedsville places it in the Upper Ordovician. It rests conformably atop the Upper Ordovician Coburn Formation at the top of the Trenton Group limestone and conformably below the Bald Eagle Formation.

Isotopic dating of shale mylonite in Pennsylvania reveals a K-Ar age of 372+/-8 Ma.

Economic uses
The Reedsville is quarried locally in borrow pits for road material and fill.

Palaeontology

References

See also
Geology of Pennsylvania

Sandstone formations of the United States
Shale formations of the United States
Ordovician geology of Pennsylvania
Ordovician geology of Tennessee
Ordovician West Virginia
Ordovician southern paleotemperate deposits